Changchun American International School (CAIS) is an American international school in Changchun, Jilin. Opened in 2006 and is (as of 2019) a certified IB school.

Serving ages 3–19, it was the first international school to be established in the province.

See also
Americans in China

References

External links
 Changchun American International School
 Changchun American International School 

American international schools in China
Education in Changchun